The 2016–17 Polish Basketball League was the 83rd season of the highest professional basketball tier in Poland and the 21st since the foundation of the Polish Basketball League.

Teams
As finishing in one of the two last positions during the two previous seasons, Siarka Tarnobrzeg lost its right to participate in the PLK. However, the club was invited to join the league.

As champion of the previous I Liga, Miasto Szkła Krosno was promoted.

After the ejection of Śląsk Wrocław, the league was played by 17 teams. The intention of PLK is to reduce the number of clubs in the PLK to 16 and to eliminate contracts by introducing regular promotions and relegations. For this season, three teams will be relegated to the I Liga.

Regular season

Playoffs

Polish teams in European competitions

References

External links
Polska Liga Koszykówki - Official Site 
Polish League at Eurobasket.com

Polish Basketball League seasons
Polish
Lea